Anugrah Narayan Magadh Medical College and Hospital (ANMMCH) is a government medical college in Gaya, Bihar. It was established in 1969 and is approved  by  Medical Council of India (MCI). It is named after Bihar Vibhuti Dr Anugrah Narayan Sinha.

History
The college is situated at Gaya in south Bihar and was founded in 1969. At that time there were only three medical colleges in Bihar: One in Patna, North Bihar Darbhanga, and another in Ranchi (now in Jharkhand) the southern part of Bihar.

The Institute
Currently composed of 18 departments, the college  is a government run medical institution and is recognized by the  Medical Council of India (MCI). Its governing body lays down the objectives and policies of the organization, while the director is responsible for academic and general management of the institution.

Infrastructure
The campus is spread over an area of 43.85 acres. The infrastructure includes the hospital, an administration block, a library, three high-tech classrooms, museums, residential buildings and guest houses for the faculty and staff. The campus also has facilities for playing indoor and outdoor games, a UCO bank branch, a post-mortem room, and a police station.

Magadh Utsav
The college hosts an annual fest called "Magadh Utsav", which is organized by the students in 2nd year. It is a week-long fest organized in the month of February/March. The "Magadh Utsav" is attended and enjoyed by all the members of the medical fraternity. It includes the following competitions :
Antakshari
Dare Show
Matka Jhatka
Rangoli Making
Indoors: Chess, Ludo, Table Tennis, Carrom
Outdoors: Cricket, Football, Volleyball, Badminton
Literary Event
Sports Meet
DJ Night
La Fête - Cultural Night

Departments 
Anaesthesia
Anatomy
Biochemistry
Community Medicine
Dermatology And Sexually Transmitted Diseases
Forensic Medicine Including Toxicology
Human Physiology Including Biophysics
Medicine
Microbiology
Obstetrics And Gynaecology
Ophthalmology
Orthopaedics
Otorhinolaryngology
Pathology
Paediatrics
Pharmacology
Physical Medicine and  Rehabilitation
Psychiatry
 Radio-Diagnosis and Radiotherapy
Surgery

See also

References

External links
A N Magadh Medical College Gaya(MCI)
Official Site ANMMCH
Medical Institutes of Bihar
Departments of ANMMCH
Courses at ANMMCH

Medical colleges in Bihar
Universities and colleges in Bihar
Education in Gaya, India
Hospitals in Bihar
1969 establishments in Bihar
Educational institutions established in 1969
Hospitals established in 1969
Medical Council of India
Research institutes in Bihar
Colleges affiliated to Aryabhatta Knowledge University